Washington Street Tunnel may refer to:

Washington Street Tunnel (Chicago), a road tunnel in Chicago
Washington Street Tunnel (Boston), a subway tunnel in Boston